The Fourth Erdoğan Cabinet is the 66th government of the Republic of Turkey, which was declared on 9 July 2018. It is the first cabinet after Turkey's transition into a presidential republic. It was also the first cabinet that did not require parliamentary approval to be formed, and thus has a higher number of technocrats than previous Turkish cabinets.

Structural changes
In this new system, the number of ministries were reduced from 21 to 16. Also, six new cabinet posts have been established, including the office of the Vice President. A statutory decree was issued to merge several ministries, and also to abolish certain organizational and functional laws of some ministries and institutions.

Changes in 2021
On 21 April 2021, the Ministry of Family, Labor and Social Services was divided into two with a presidential decree published in the official government gazette.

Cabinet changes
On 27 March 2020, Transport and Infrastructure Minister Mehmet Cahit Turhan was replaced by the President.

On 10 April 2020, Minister of the Interior Süleyman Soylu issued a curfew due to increasing Covid19 cases. The late announcement and the panic it created among the public was widely criticized. On 12 April 2020, Süleyman Soylu issued an apology and announced his resignation. However, his resignation was rejected by the President and Soylu continued his duties as minister.

On 8 November 2020, Treasury and Finance Minister Berat Albayrak announced his resignation citing health reasons. His resignation was approved the next day by the President.

On 21 April 2021, two new ministries were established as the Ministry of Family, Labor and Social Services was split into two. Minister of Family, Labor and Social Services Zehra Zümrüt Selçuk was dismissed. Derya Yanık was appointed to the Ministry of Family and Social Policy and Vedat Bilgin was appointed to the Ministry of Labor and Social Security. In addition, Ruhsar Pekcan was replaced by Mehmet Muş as the new Minister of Trade.

Composition

References

External links

 Presidential Cabinet, Presidency Of The Republic Of Türkiye

Cabinets of Turkey
2018 in Turkish politics
2018 establishments in Turkey
Cabinets established in 2018
 
Current governments